= Crown princes in pre-Islamic Iran =

The position of a crown prince in pre-Islamic Iran was affirmed in the Median and early Achaemenid eras, when sovereignty was becoming standardized, due to the influence of Mesopotamian, Urartian, and Elamite practices.

It was during this period that the Avestan word vīsō puθra ("son of the clan") was adopted to denote “crown prince.” The word became visa-puthra in Old Persian.

By the early Achaemenid period, a king preparing to participate in a military expedition, was required to appoint his heir, in case the king would die. Usually the appointment of an heir was based on his ancestry, physical quality, and leadership features.

== Sources ==
- Shapur Shahbazi, A. (1993). "CROWN PRINCE". Encyclopaedia Iranica, Vol. VI, Fasc. 4. London u.a.: Routledge & Kegan Paul. pp. 430–432. ISBN 90-04-08114-3.
- Llewellyn-Jones, Lloyd (2013). King and Court in Ancient Persia 559 to 331 BCE. Edinburgh University Press. pp. 1–272. ISBN 9780748677115.
